Kap Bambino is a French electronic music duo created in 2001 by Orion Bouvier and Caroline Martial in Bordeaux, France.

Style and themes  
The group is known for Caroline Martial's wild vocals, Orion Bouvier's intense electronic beats, and their exciting live performances. In 2001 Martial formed the group's own independent label, "wwilko". They performed at the festivals Dot to Dot in 2007 and ZXZW in 2009. They have been featured in NME, Another Magazine, Dummy Mag and Dazed & Confused. The group was featured in Matt Irwin's 2007 film for Armani Exchange. Caroline was listed among the "hottest young models in London and New York." The group has independently toured all over Europe, Japan and Latin America. In 2009, they were a part of SXSW, and their single "Dead Lazers" made BIGSTEREO's May 2009 charts for top downloads, placed number 8. 

The two have separate side projects outside of Kap Bambino, Bouvier is "Groupgris", and Martial is "Khima France".

Members 

 Orion Bouvier – keyboards
 Caroline Martial – vocals

Discography

Studio albums
 Love (2002) 
 Zero Life Night Vision (2006) 
 Zero Life Night Vision 12' (2008) 
 Blacklist (2009) 
 Devotion (2012) 
 Dust, Fierce, Forever (2019)

Singles and EPs
 NAZ4 (2002) 
 Neutral (2005) 
 New Breath / Hey! (2007) 
 Save / Krak Hunter (2008) 
 Red Sign / Acid Eyes (2009)
 Dead Lazers (2009) 
 Batcaves (2009) 
 Obsess (2011) 
 Resistance Alpha / Rise (2011) 
 Under Tender / Degenerate (2012)
 Erase (2019)
Forever (2019)

Side projects 

 Groupgris – electronic music group with Orion Bouvier

 Khima France – electronic music Caroline Martial

References

External links
 Official website
Kap Bambino at Bandcamp
Kap Bambino at Facebook
Kap Bambino discography at Discogs
 Kap Bambino discography at MusicBrainz

Electronic music duos
French electronic music groups
Musical groups established in 2001
Musical groups from Nouvelle-Aquitaine
Because Music artists
Electropunk musical groups
Electroclash groups
French musical duos
Male–female musical duos